is a Japanese female rugby sevens player. She competed for the Japan women's national rugby sevens team at the 2016 Summer Olympics. They finished in tenth place. She was named in the Sakura Sevens squad to compete at the 2022 Rugby World Cup Sevens in Cape Town.

References

External links 
 
 

1994 births
Living people
People from Matsudo
Olympic rugby sevens players of Japan
Japanese rugby sevens players
Japan international women's rugby sevens players
Rugby sevens players at the 2016 Summer Olympics
Rugby union players at the 2018 Asian Games
Asian Games gold medalists for Japan
Medalists at the 2018 Asian Games
Asian Games medalists in rugby union